was a railway station located in the city of Kamaishi, Iwate Prefecture, Japan, operated by the third-sector railway operator Sanriku Railway Company.

Lines
Heita Station is served by the Rias Line, and is 33.1 kilometers from the terminus of the line at Sakari Station.

Station layout 
Heita Station has a single elevated side platform serving a single bi-directional track. There is no station building, but only a weather shelter directly on the platform. The station is unattended.

Adjacent stations

History 
Heita Station opened on 1 April 1984. During the 11 March 2011 Tōhoku earthquake and tsunami, part of the tracks on the Minami-Rias Line were swept away, thus suspending services. The line resumed operations on 3 April 2013 between Sakari and Yoshihama. Services between Yoshihama and Kamaishi resumed on 5 April 2014. Minami-Rias Line, a portion of Yamada Line, and Kita-Rias Line constitute Rias Line in 23 March 2019. Accordingly, this station became an intermediate station of Rias Line.

Surrounding area 
 Heita Elementary School
 Heita Post Office
Japan National Route 45

See also
 List of railway stations in Japan

References

External links

  

Railway stations in Iwate Prefecture
Railway stations in Japan opened in 1984
Kamaishi, Iwate